Wyze or WYZE may refer to:

 WYZE (AM), a radio station in Atlanta, Georgia, United States
 Wyze Labs, a company based in Seattle, Washington, United States
 Project Wyze, a Canadian rap metal band